Margery is a hamlet in Banstead Downs, Surrey.

Margery may also refer to:

 Margery (name)
 Margery Hill, a hill towards the northern boundary of the Peak District National Park, South Yorkshire
 Margery and Gladys, a 2003 British drama
 Margery Austin (schooner), (1918–1919)

See also
Margery Daw (disambiguation), character, nursery rhyme, books
4064 Marjorie (2126 P-L), a main-belt asteroid discovered in 1960
Marjorie
Marjory